Mohamed Mouldi Kefi (born February 10, 1946 in Le Kef, Tunisia) was the Minister of Foreign Affairs of Tunisia under the transitional government in 2011, and is a retired diplomat. He is married and has four children.

His diplomatic career started in Czechoslovakia where he met his wife, Dagmar, and went on in Eastern Germany, the Soviet Union, the United Kingdom, Nigeria, Russia and Indonesia. He retired in 2006 when he was 60 years old.

He has a degree in philosophy from the Strasbourg University in France.

References

1946 births
Living people
Government ministers of Tunisia
People of the Tunisian Revolution
Foreign ministers of Tunisia